On April 24, 1944, at Pyrgoi (Katranitsa) took place the biggest slaughter of Greeks civilians (after this Kalavryta) by German Nazis and their local accomplices. The events of April 1944 were later the subject of dozens of documentaries, and generated wide interest. Among the atrocities that were committed by the Nazis, 368 men women and children were killed and burned alive. Colonel Karl Schümers, commander of the 7th constitution armored Grenadier police of the SS, was responsible for the massacres in Pyrgoi, Kleisoura Kastoria, and Distomo Boeotia which killed 862 men, women and children. The survivors were forced to walk to Ptolemaida and town completely destroyed. Each year to Pyrgoi being present in established memorial for the victims of the Holocaust, the Greek President.

 -->

Conflicts in 1944
Nazi war crimes in Greece
Mass murder in 1944
1944 in Greece
April 1944 events
Massacres in 1944
Massacres in Greece during World War II
Greek Macedonia in World War II